is a metro station located in Kōhoku Ward, Yokohama, Kanagawa Prefecture, Japan. It is served by the Yokohama Municipal Subway’s  Green Line (Line 4) and is 10.3 kilometers from the terminus of the Green Line at Nakayama Station.

History
Takata Station opened on March 30, 2008, when the Green Line started operation.

Lines 
Yokohama Municipal Subway
Green Line

Station layout
Takata Station has two single underground split platforms.

Platforms

References
 Harris, Ken and Clarke, Jackie. Jane's World Railways 2008-2009. Jane's Information Group (2008).

External links
 Takata Station (Japanese)

Railway stations in Kanagawa Prefecture
Railway stations in Japan opened in 2008
Green Line (Yokohama)